A Little Light Music (1992) is a Jethro Tull live album.  All songs were recorded during a semi-acoustic European tour in May 1992. Greek singer George Dalaras participates and sings a duet with Ian Anderson in the song "John Barleycorn" on the Italian version of the album only, the worldwide version has a re-recorded vocal by Ian Anderson.

Track listing
 "Someday the Sun Won't Shine for You" (Athens, 13/14 May 1992) – 3:59
 "Living in the Past" , instrumental (London, 2 May 1992) – 5:06
 "Life Is a Long Song" (Frankfurt, 12 May 1992) – 3:36
 "Rocks on the Road" (Caesarea, 23 May 1992) – 7:03
 "Under Wraps" , (Instrumental) (Zurich, 6/7 May 1992) – 2:29
 "Nursie" (Mannheim, 5 May 1992) – 2:27
 "Too Old to Rock 'n' Roll: Too Young to Die" (Ankara, 16 May 1992) – 4:43
 "One White Duck"  (Prague, 10 May 1992) – 3:15
 "A New Day Yesterday" (Graz, 9 May 1992) – 7:33
 "John Barleycorn" (Athens, 13/14 May 1992) – 6:34
 "Look into the Sun" , instrumental (Caesarea, 23 May 1992) – 3:45
 "A Christmas Song" (Caesarea, 23 May 1992) – 3:45
 "From a Dead Beat to an Old Greaser" (Munich, 7 May 1992) – 3:49
 "This Is Not Love" (Caesarea, 23 May 1992) – 3:52
 "Bourée" , instrumental (Berlin, 11 May 1992) – 6:04
 "Pussy Willow" , instrumental (Dortmund, 4 May 1992) – 3:30
 "Locomotive Breath" (Jerusalem, 21 May 1992) – 5:50

Personnel 
 Ian Anderson – flute, mandolin, harmonica, acoustic guitar, percussion, vocals
 Martin Barre – electric guitar, acoustic guitar
 Dave Pegg – bass, mandolin
 Dave Mattacks – snare drum, bass drum, hi-hat, cymbal, glockenspiel, percussion, keyboard

Remaster
A remastered edition of the album was released in September 2006. It contained no bonus tracks.

Notes 
 UK release 14 September 1992, chart No. 34
 US release 22 September 1992, chart No. 150

Charts

References

External links 
 1992 Jethro Tull Concert Schedule

Jethro Tull (band) live albums
1992 live albums
Live progressive rock albums
Chrysalis Records live albums